Afghanistan sent a team to compete at the  2008 Summer Olympics in Beijing, China. The team consisted of three men and one woman. Initially, Mehboba Ahdyar prepared to run the 800 metres and 1500 metres, but left her training camp on June 4 to seek political asylum in Norway.
The country was represented by two competitors in athletics, and two in taekwondo. Afghanistan won its first ever Olympic medal at these games, with Rohullah Nikpai taking bronze in men's 58 kg taekwondo.

Medalists

Athletics

Competitors in athletics events could qualify for the next round of competition in two ways. Qualifying by right involved ranking high enough in their heat, and qualifying by result meant ranking high enough in overall standings. Ranks shown are therefore those within each heat, not in overall standings.

Men

Women

Taekwondo

References

Nations at the 2008 Summer Olympics
2008
Olympics